Akaishi Dam is a gravity dam located in Aomori Prefecture in Japan. The dam is used for power production. The catchment area of the dam is 45.6 km2. The dam impounds about 12  ha of land when full and can store 831 thousand cubic meters of water. The construction of the dam was started on 1953 and completed in 1955.

References

Dams in Aomori Prefecture
1955 establishments in Japan